Algeria sent a delegation to compete at the 2008 Summer Paralympics in Beijing, People's Republic of China.

Competitors

Medallists

The following Algerian competitors won medals at the games:

| width=75% align=left valign=top |

| width=25% align=left valign=top |

Results by event

Athletics

Men–track

Men–field

Women–field

Judo

Men
Sidali Lamri defeated Japan's Satoshi Fujimoto in the men's -66 kg final to win gold for his country.

Women

See also
Algeria at the Paralympics
Algeria at the 2008 Summer Olympics

References

External links
International Paralympic Committee
Beijing 2008 Paralympic Games Official Site

Nations at the 2008 Summer Paralympics
2008
Paralympics